is a horizontally scrolling shooter developed by Hot-B and released in arcades by Taito in 1989. It was ported to the Mega Drive and Famicom.

Gameplay
The player controls an insect-sized warrior named "Kai", who takes on a vast army of cyborg insects to free the insect world from the dark ruler queen. The game uses two buttons: one for an upgradable main shot, and another for a seemingly random selection of secondary weapons.

Ports

Hot-B converted Insector-X to the Famicom for Taito with minor changes, as well as their own revised version for the Sega Mega Drive. The original arcade version is included in Taito Legends 2.

The Mega Drive version has a number of differences: "realistic" sprite work (compared to the "cute" style of the original), brand new music, a reworking of the secondary weapon system, the removal of the autofire powerup, and new stage sections, among other things. Hot-B's original design for the game was better realized on the Mega Drive, as Taito requested a more comical style of game for the original release. It was published in Japan by Hot-B themselves, and in the United States by Sage's Creation.

Reception 

In Japan, Game Machine listed Insector X on their October 15, 1989 issue as being the twenty-fourth most-successful table arcade unit of the month. Console XS gave an overall score of 94% praising the graphics and sound calling the game a superb shoot-‘em-up. MegaTech gave an overall review score of 74% and felt the game is fun at first and praised the graphics and sound saying it adds to the excitement although they felt the game's action offers very little in original features and said there is better shoot-em-ups then Insector X. Raze magazine gave a score of 80% praising the graphics as "Superb" and praised the detailed backgrounds and the well animated and intricately drawn characters.  The reviewer also praised the game music and sound effects concluding: "If I had to choose between this and XDR, I’d go for Insector X every time."

References

External links 
 

1989 video games
Arcade video games
Nintendo Entertainment System games
Horizontally scrolling shooters
Hot B games
Sega Genesis games
Video games about insects
Taito arcade games
Video games developed in Japan
Single-player video games